The Blackpool Built-up Area or Blackpool Urban Area is an urban area in Lancashire, England, consisting of the large town of Blackpool along with several surrounding towns and villages. Defined by the ONS it had a population of 239,409 in 2011 this is considerably down on the 2001 population of 261,088  mainly due to Fleetwood no longer being considered as part of the built-up area. The population of the Blackpool Urban Area has been declining for some time with the 2001 population down 0.1% from the 1991 figure of 261,355.

The Blackpool subdivision itself has a population of 147,633, although during the summer months the population of the town can rise to three times this figure. According to Lancashire Tourist Board there were 360,000 people living in the town during April and August 2003, the majority of these people working in Blackpool for the summer season.

The entirety of the Blackpool Urban Area lies within the FY postcode area. The code refers to the Fylde, making it one of only five postcode areas in the UK that does not reference one of its settlements (although its official name is the Blackpool postcode area).

The built up area is split over three local government districts: the Blackpool unitary authority area, the Borough of Fylde and the Borough of Wyre. The area has nine railway stations, and parts of it are served by the Blackpool Tramway. It is made up of the following subdivisions:

Notes:

References

Blackpool
Geography of Blackpool
Geography of the Borough of Fylde
Geography of the Borough of Wyre
The Fylde